American composer William Schuman's Symphony No. 3 was completed on January 11, 1941, and premiered on October 17 of that year by the Boston Symphony Orchestra conducted by Serge Koussevitsky, to whom it is dedicated.

Instrumentation
The symphony is scored for an orchestra consisting of piccolo (doubling flute), 2 flutes, 2 oboes, cor anglais, clarinet in E, 2 clarinets in B, bass clarinet, 2 bassoons, 4 horns in F, 4 trumpets in C, 4 trombones, tuba, snare drum, cymbals, bass drum, xylophone, timpani and strings. Third flute (doubling second piccolo), third oboe, third clarinet in B, third bassoon, contrabassoon, 4 more horns in F, and piano are also listed as "optional, but very desirable".

Structure
Rather than the usual four movements, the symphony is in two parts, each consisting of two continuous sections in a tempo relation of slow-fast and given titles suggesting Baroque formal practices, though Schuman does not follow these forms strictly:
Part I:
a) Passacaglia
b) Fugue
Part II:
c) Chorale
d) Toccata

References
Schuman, William (1942). Symphony no. 3 (score). G. Schirmer

Notes

Further reading
Clark, John W., and William Schuman. 1986. "William Schuman on His Symphonies: An Interview" American Music 4, no. 3 (Autumn): 328–36.

Symphonies by William Schuman
1941 compositions